Anastasia Oleksandrivna Kochetova (born 13 April 1989), known by her stage name MamaRika and previously Erika, is a Ukrainian singer and actress.

Early life 
Kochetova was born on 13 April 1989 in Chervonohrad. She graduated from the Faculty of Foreign Languages of the University of Lviv, where she specialized in translating to English. She worked as an office manager and vocal teacher.

Career

Early career 
At the age of 14, Kochetova won the Chervona Ruta competition. At the age of 17, she participated in the talent show American Chance, led by producer David Junk, who had previously achieved success in the United States with the Russian groups t.A.T.u. and Smash!! She was one of five girls who were grouped as Glam. However, the project was halted in early 2008 as a result of the global financial crisis and a low amount of interest in the project from the American music industry as a likely result of it. Glam released one promotional song, "Thirsty", which was never released commercially.

2009–2015: Erika 
At the age of 19, Kochetova, under the pseudonym "Erica", became a finalist in the talent show "Fabryka Zirok 3" under the direction of Konstantin Meladze. She returned as a host of live broadcasts of Fabryka Zirok 4 and took part in Fabrika Zvyozd: Russia-Ukraine.

From 2010 to 2015, Erika was a singer at the UMMG Production Center under producer Serhiy Kuzin. On 7 April 2011, the premiere of the animated film Rio took place, in which Erica voiced Jewel in the Ukrainian dub. In August of the same year, she won the Crystal Microphone show business award in the Singer of the Year category. Erica's conference has repeatedly accompanied local and large-scale events, including concerts in Maidan Nezalezhnosti. In 2012 she starred in the musical "Happy New Year, Peace!" in Kazakhstan. In 2013, Erica collaborated with American opera singer George Komsky, as well as with Grammy-winning producers Bobby Campbell and Andrew Kapner of AngelHouseStudios in Los Angeles.

2016–present: MamaRika 
In early April 2016, Kochetova had stopped working with Kuzin and changed her stage name to "MamaRika". The same month saw the premiere of the comedy TV series Once Upon a Time in Odessa, in which she played the role of Yulia. In 2017, she performed at the first MRPL City festival in Mariupol In December of the same year in one of Kyiv's clubs she presented a concert program and a second studio album "KACH".

Personal life
Kochetova is married to Serhiy Sereda and they live in Odesa. On 2 August 2021, she gave birth to a son. She is fond of yoga.

Discography

Studio albums
 2012 — Папарацци (Paparazzi)
 2017 — КАЧ (Quality)

Singles 
 2013 — Душа (Soul, featuring Motor'rolla)
 2011 — Смайлик (Smiley)
 2013 — Папарацци (Paparazzi)
 2016 — МамаРіка (MamaRika)
 2016 — Ніч у барі (Night at the Bar)
 2017 — We are one

References

External links 

1989 births
Living people
People from Chervonohrad
21st-century Ukrainian women singers
Ukrainian pop singers
Ukrainian rock singers
Ukrainian jazz singers
Ukrainian sopranos
Ukrainian film actresses
Ukrainian television actresses
Ukrainian voice actresses